Gachgaran (also Romanized as Gachgarān; also known as Qal‘eh-e Chāh Gīrān, Qal‘eh Gach Gīrān, and Qal‘eh-ye Kajgīrān) is a village in Bakesh-e Yek Rural District, in the Central District of Mamasani County, Fars Province, Iran. At the 2006 census, its population was 1,158, in 255 families.

References 

Populated places in Mamasani County